Tscherning is a German surname. It may refer to:

 Andreas Tscherning (1611–1659), German poet
 Anton Frederik Tscherning (1795-1874), a Danish army officer who became a politician
 Eleonora Tscherning (1817–1890), Danish painter
 Henny Tscherning (1853–1932), Danish nurse and trade unionist
 Marius Tscherning (1854–1939), Danish ophthalmologist
 Willy Tscherning (1917–2012), German Oberfeldwebel during World War II

German-language surnames